Bachowice  is a village in the administrative district of Gmina Spytkowice, within Wadowice County, Lesser Poland Voivodeship, in southern Poland.

References

Bachowice